The 2018 Syed Modi International Badminton Championships was a badminton tournament which took place at the Babu Banarasi Das Indoor Stadium in Lucknow, India, from 20 to 25 November 2018 and had a total prize of $150,000.

Tournament
The 2018 Syed Modi International was the twenty-fifth tournament of the 2018 BWF World Tour and also part of the Syed Modi International Badminton Championships, which had been held since 1991. This tournament was organized by Badminton Association of India and sanctioned by the BWF.

Venue
This international tournament was held at the Babu Banarasi Das Indoor Stadium in Lucknow, Uttar Pradesh, India.

Point distribution
Below is the point distribution table for each phase of the tournament based on the BWF points system for the BWF World Tour Super 300 event.

Prize money
The total prize money for this tournament was US$150,000. Distribution of prize money was in accordance with BWF regulations.

Men's singles

Seeds

 Srikanth Kidambi (withdrew)
 Prannoy Kumar (first round)
 Sameer Verma (champion)
 B. Sai Praneeth (quarter-finals)
 Misha Zilberman (withdrew)
 Lu Guangzu (final)
 Sourabh Verma (first round)
 Sitthikom Thammasin (semi-finals)

Finals

Top half

Section 1

Section 2

Bottom half

Section 3

Section 4

Women's singles

Seeds

 P. V. Sindhu (withdrew)
 Saina Nehwal (final)
 Sayaka Takahashi (withdrew)
 Han Yue (champion)
 Zhang Yiman (quarter-finals)
 Dinar Dyah Ayustine (quarter-finals)
 Li Xuerui (semi-finals)
 Rituparna Das (quarter-finals)

Finals

Top half

Section 1

Section 2

Bottom half

Section 3

Section 4

Men's doubles

Seeds

 Kim Astrup / Anders Skaarup Rasmussen (first round)
 Fajar Alfian / Muhammad Rian Ardianto (champions)
 Takuto Inoue / Yuki Kaneko (withdrew)
 Hiroyuki Endo / Yuta Watanabe (first round)
 Mathias Boe / Carsten Mogensen (semi-finals)
 Han Chengkai / Zhou Haodong (quarter-finals)
 Vladimir Ivanov / Ivan Sozonov (semi-finals)
 Satwiksairaj Rankireddy / Chirag Shetty (final)

Finals

Top half

Section 1

Section 2

Bottom half

Section 3

Section 4

Women's doubles

Seeds

 Misaki Matsutomo / Ayaka Takahashi (first round)
 Della Destiara Haris / Rizki Amelia Pradipta (semi-finals)
 Chow Mei Kuan / Lee Meng Yean (champions)
 Ashwini Ponnappa / N. Sikki Reddy (final)
 Ekaterina Bolotova / Alina Davletova (semi-finals)
 Vivian Hoo Kah Mun / Yap Cheng Wen (second round)
 Meghana Jakkampudi / Poorvisha S. Ram (first round)
 Ni Ketut Mahadewi Istirani / Virni Putri (second round)

Finals

Top half

Section 1

Section 2

Bottom half

Section 3

Section 4

Mixed doubles

Seeds

 Pranav Chopra / N. Sikki Reddy (first round)
 Evgenij Dremin / Evgenia Dimova (second round)
 Chen Tang Jie / Peck Yen Wei (withdrew)
 Rinov Rivaldy / Pitha Haningtyas Mentari (final)
 Alfian Eko Prasetya / Marsheilla Gischa Islami (semi-finals)
 Satwiksairaj Rankireddy / Ashwini Ponnappa (semi-finals)
 Nipitphon Phuangphuapet / Savitree Amitrapai (quarter-finals)
 Tontowi Ahmad / Della Destiara Haris (withdrew)

Finals

Top half

Section 1

Section 2

Bottom half

Section 3

Section 4

References

External links
 Tournament Link

Syed Modi International Badminton Championships
Syed Modi International
Syed Modi International
Syed Modi International